Orders of the Government of Russia is secondary legislation, a normative administrative directive content published by the Government of the Russian Federation within the limits of its competence, on the basis and in pursuance of the Constitution of the Russian Federation, federal constitutional laws, federal laws and Decrees of the President of Russia.

Legal basis
Government orders signed by the Prime Minister of Russia. Government orders are binding in the Russian Federation. In the event of conflict with  the Constitution of the Russian Federation, federal laws and decrees of the President, government orders may be revoked by the President of Russia. order of the Government of the Russian Federation may also be deemed to be unconstitutional by the Constitutional Court of the Russian Federation.

Publication
Resolution of the Government of the Russian Federation are subject to compulsory official publication, except for acts or separate provisions, containing information constituting a state secret, or confidential information. Resolution of the Government of the Russian Federation must be officially published in Rossiskaya Gazeta and the Assembly of the RF legislation, within ten days from the date of signing. Control over the correctness and timeliness of publication of government decrees implementing Government Office. Other acts of the Russian government, including acts that contain information containing state secrets or confidential information, enter into force on the date of signing. The decisions of the Government of the Russian Federation can be equipped with a different order of their entry into force.

Government of Russia
Politics of Russia
Law of Russia
Public administration